Chris Rynning (born August 14, 1967) is the founder of Chinese venture fund nHack, advisor to the Norwegian state-owned investment fund Investinor, author, entrepreneur, and financial commentator. Rynning has self-published two books about China, Little Streams, Big River (2013) and China AI: How China Will Dominate AI and Blockchain Technology (2018), and publishes a newsletter on Chinese economics and financial events.

From December 2006 until January 2015, Rynning was CEO of the London Alternative Investment Market listed Origo Partners PLC. Origo is a closed-end investment company which holds a portfolio of unquoted interests and illiquid publicly traded equity interests in companies based or principally active in China and Mongolia. Rynning was also a director of Origo Advisors Ltd, which provided management services to the company through March 2019.

Rynning was based in Beijing from 1997 through 2016 and has held roles in China including among others Founder and Managing Partner of Ascend Ventures, Managing Partner of MINT, PWC Consulting's joint venture investment arm in China, and Regional Director of Asia with Elkem, an Oslo and Frankfurt listed company.

A graduate of ESSEC in Paris, Rynning also holds an MBA with specialization in Finance from the University of Chicago. Rynning was the Chairman of the Norwegian Business Association in Beijing and Adjunct Professor II at Handelshøyskolen Trondheim (HIST), Norway. Rynning was also the Editor of Norwegian Links- a business magazine connecting China and Scandinavia. Rynning has been a commentator with various Chinese and western media, including Bloomberg, CNBC, FT, DN, PE International and Finansavisen.

References

1967 births
Living people
Norwegian chief executives
University of Chicago Booth School of Business alumni
ESSEC Business School alumni
Norwegian expatriates in China
People from Trondheim